The personnel halting and stimulation response rifle (PHASR) is a prototype non-lethal laser dazzler developed by the Air Force Research Laboratory's Directed Energy Directorate, U.S. Department of Defense. Its purpose is to temporarily disorient and blind a target. Blinding laser weapons have been tested in the past, but were banned under the 1995 UN Protocol on Blinding Laser Weapons, which the United States acceded to on 21 January 2009. The PHASR rifle, a low-intensity laser, is not prohibited under this regulation, as the blinding effect is intended to be temporary.  It also uses a two-wavelength laser. The PHASR was tested at Kirtland Air Force Base, part of the Air Force Research Laboratory Directed Energy Directorate in New Mexico.

Its name is likely derived from the fictional "Phaser" of Star Trek lore, which is known for being depicted as an easily portable directed-energy weapon which has a lethal mode and a mode that can strike living targets with non-lethal temporarily incapacitating effects; this is often accompanied by the on-screen dialogue, "Set phasers to stun."

See also 
Veiling-glare laser
Directed-energy weapon

References

External links 
US military sets laser PHASRs to stun
U.S. Air Force News Release
Text of the UN Protocol on Blinding Laser Weapons
List of countries participating in the UN Protocol on Blinding Laser Weapons
How Laser Weapons Work, Science.howstuffworks.com

Law enforcement equipment
Military lasers
Non-lethal weapons